is a Japanese retired track and field sprinter. She won a bronze medal in the 400 metres and a gold medal in the 4 × 400 metres relay at the 2011 Asian Championships in Kobe. She was also the 2010 Japanese national champion in the 400 metres.

Personal bests

International competition

National title
Japanese Championships
400 m: 2010

References

External links

Chisato Tanaka at JAAF 

1988 births
Living people
Japanese female sprinters
Sportspeople from Fukuoka Prefecture
Athletes (track and field) at the 2010 Asian Games
Japan Championships in Athletics winners
Fukuoka University alumni
Asian Games competitors for Japan